The Netherlands Football League Championship 1901–1902 was contested by fifteen teams participating in two divisions. The national champion would be determined by a play-off featuring the winners of the eastern and western football division of the Netherlands. HVV Den Haag won this year's championship by beating Victoria Wageningen 2-2, 3–1.

New entrant
Eerste Klasse West:
Koninklijke HFC returned after one season of absence

Divisions

Eerste Klasse East

Eerste Klasse West

Championship play-off

HVV Den Haag won the championship.

References
RSSSF Netherlands Football League Championships 1898-1954
RSSSF Eerste Klasse Oost
RSSSF Eerste Klasse West

Netherlands Football League Championship seasons
1901 in Dutch sport
1902 in Dutch sport